Grueso is a surname. Notable people with the surname include:

Antonio Latorre Grueso, Spanish footballer
Daniel Grueso (born 1985), Colombian sprinter
Gustavo Adolfo Torres Grueso (born 1996), Colombian footballer
Libia Grueso, Colombian social worker and civil rights activist
Roberto Carlos Peña Grueso (born 1984), Colombian footballer

See also
Gruezo:
Carlos Gruezo (footballer, born 1975), Ecuadorian footballer
Carlos Gruezo (footballer, born 1995), Ecuadorian footballer